Denley is both a surname and a given name. Notable people with the name include:

People with the surname
Jim Denley (born 1957) Australian improviser of new musics
Michael Denley (born 1931), British athlete
Peter Denley, New Democratic Party candidate in Ontario, Canada
Randall Denley, Canadian journalist, author and politician

People with the given name
Denley Loge, American politician

See also
Denley Limestone, geologic formation in New York
Re Denley's Trust Deed, an English trusts law case
Deley